Jules Herremans (10 July 1904 – 20 October 1974) was a Belgian athlete. He competed in the men's javelin throw at the 1928 Summer Olympics.

References

1904 births
1974 deaths
Athletes (track and field) at the 1928 Summer Olympics
Belgian male javelin throwers
Olympic athletes of Belgium
Place of birth missing